General elections were held in Sweden on 17 and 18 September 1932. The Swedish Social Democratic Party remained the largest party, winning 104 of the 230 seats in the Andra kammaren of the Riksdag. The party returned to government after six years in opposition, marking the beginning of 44 years of near-uninterrupted rule (the only exception was three months in 1936). This was also the first time the socialist parties received an overall majority of the elected parties' popular vote, although the Hansson cabinet still required cross-aisle co-operation to govern since the centre-right parties won 118 out of 230 seats.

Results

The Clerical People's Party, albeit a separate party, received 8,911 votes or 0.4% of the vote share, but had the votes re-assigned to the General Electoral League as a result of them forfeiting their votes out of tactical purposes and were listed as Electoral League or "Rightist" votes in the official final results. No Clerical People's Party member got elected to the Riksdag, which meant the Electoral League covered the entire rightist delegation. Therefore the General Electoral League may correctly be attributed to both 23.1% and 23.5% of the overall vote share.

References

General elections in Sweden
Sweden
General
Sweden